South Garden is an unincorporated community in Richmond City, in the U.S. state of Virginia.

References

Unincorporated communities in Virginia
Neighborhoods in Richmond, Virginia